Mandlenkosi Sicelo Mabika is a South African politician who was elected to the National Assembly in 2014 as a member of the National Freedom Party.

Mabika joined the Democratic Alliance in March 2019 and was re-elected to the National Assembly at that year's election in May.

Education
Mabika holds a teachers' diploma from the Rand Afrikaans University, a personal management certificate, a Bachelor of Arts degree from the University of Durban-Westville, and a Bachelor of Education Honours from Stellenbosch University.

Political career
Mabika joined the National Freedom Party shortly after its founding in January 2011 and was appointed a district secretary for the party. In December of that same year, he was voted in as the party's deputy national chairperson. At the 2014 general election, Mabika won a seat in the National Assembly. He was named to the National Assembly's committees on environmental affairs, economic development, sport and recreation, and transport.

In 2015, he was expelled from the NFP over claims of bringing the party into disrepute. He was reinstated later on. In August 2016, Mabika and fellow NFP MP Maliyakhe Shelembe were suspended from the party for refusing to co-operate with investigators investigating the party's failure to participate in the municipal elections held that month. Both were later reinstated.

In March 2019, two months prior to that year's general election in May, Mabika and Shelembe joined the Democratic Alliance. They were both welcomed into the party by the party leader, Mmusi Maimane. Mabika and Shelembe were also placed on the DA's national list for the election and were elected to return to the National Assembly as DA MPs. His constituency area is Zululand North.

In the 2020 Register of Members’ Interests, Mabika declared that he has several property interests: 16 flats in Manguzi and cottages with 14 rooms in Hlazane in northern KwaZulu-Natal.

Personal life
Mabika is married to Slindie.

References

Living people
Year of birth missing (living people)
Place of birth missing (living people)
Zulu people
People from KwaZulu-Natal
Members of the National Assembly of South Africa
21st-century South African politicians
Democratic Alliance (South Africa) politicians
National Freedom Party politicians